Rizine Robert Mzikamanda is the current Chief Justice of Malawi. He was officially appointed on 7 January 2022 by the president of the republic of Malawi Lazarus Chakwera.

Career

References 

Living people
Year of birth missing (living people)